Pedro Luis Medel Aguilera (Granma, 10 September 1991) is a Cuban swimmer. He competed at the 2008 Olympics in the 200 m backstroke.  At the 2012 Summer Olympics he finished 34th overall in the heats in the Men's 100 metre backstroke and failed to reach the semifinals.  In the 200 m backstroke, he finished in 27th place.

References

People from Granma Province 
Cuban male swimmers
1991 births
Living people
Olympic swimmers of Cuba
Swimmers at the 2008 Summer Olympics
Swimmers at the 2012 Summer Olympics
Male backstroke swimmers
Swimmers at the 2011 Pan American Games
Pan American Games competitors for Cuba
20th-century Cuban people
21st-century Cuban people